PureVideo is Nvidia's hardware SIP core that performs video decoding. PureVideo is integrated into some of the Nvidia GPUs, and it supports hardware decoding of multiple video codec standards: MPEG-2, VC-1, H.264, HEVC, and AV1. PureVideo occupies a considerable amount of a GPU's die area and should not be confused with Nvidia NVENC. In addition to video decoding on chip, PureVideo offers features such as edge enhancement, noise reduction, deinterlacing, dynamic contrast enhancement and color enhancement.

Operating system support 

The PureVideo SIP core needs to be supported by the device driver, which provides one or more interfaces such as NVDEC, VDPAU, VAAPI or DXVA. One of these interfaces is then used by end-user software, for example VLC media player or GStreamer, to access the PureVideo hardware and make use of it.

Nvidia's proprietary device driver is available for multiple operating systems and support for PureVideo has been added to it. Additionally, a free device driver is available, which also supports the PureVideo hardware.

Linux 
Support for PureVideo has been available in Nvidia's proprietary driver version 180 since October 2008 through VDPAU. Since April 2013 nouveau also supports PureVideo hardware and provides access to it through VDPAU and partly through XvMC.

Microsoft Windows 
Microsoft's Windows Media Player, Windows Media Center and modern video players support PureVideo. Nvidia also sells PureVideo decoder software which can be used with media players which use DirectShow. Systems with dual GPU's either need to configure the codec or run the application on the Nvidia GPU to utilize PureVideo. Media players which use LAV, ffdshow or Microsoft Media Foundation codecs are able to utilize PureVideo capabilities.

OS X 
OS X was sold with Nvidia hardware, so support is probably available.

PureVideo HD
PureVideo HD (see "naming confusions" below) is a label which identifies Nvidia graphics boards certified for HD DVD and Blu-ray Disc playback, to comply with the requirements for playing Blu-ray/HD DVDs on PC:
 End-to-end encryption (HDCP) for digital-displays (DVI-D/HDMI)
 Realtime decoding of H.264 high-profile L4.1, VC-1 Advanced Profile L3, and MPEG-2 MP@HL (1080p30) decoding @ 40 Mbit/s
 Realtime dual-video stream decoding for HD DVD/Blu-ray Picture-in-Picture (primary video @ 1080p, secondary video @ 480p)

The first generation PureVideo HD
The original PureVideo engine was introduced with the GeForce 6 series.  Based on the GeForce FX's video-engine (VPE), PureVideo re-used the MPEG-1/MPEG-2 decoding pipeline, and improved the quality of deinterlacing and overlay-resizing.  Compatibility with DirectX 9's VMR9 renderer was also improved. Other VPE features, such as the MPEG-1/MPEG-2 decoding pipeline were left unchanged.  Nvidia's press material cited hardware acceleration for VC-1 and H.264 video, but these features were not present at launch.

Starting with the release of the GeForce 6600, PureVideo added hardware acceleration for VC-1 and H.264 video, though the level of acceleration is limited when benchmarked side by side with MPEG-2 video. VPE (and PureVideo) offloads the MPEG-2 pipeline starting from the inverse discrete cosine transform leaving the CPU to perform the initial run-length decoding, variable-length decoding, and inverse quantization; whereas first-generation PureVideo offered limited VC-1 assistance (motion compensation and post processing).

The first generation PureVideo HD is sometimes called "PureVideo HD 1" or VP1, although this is not an official Nvidia designation.

The second generation PureVideo HD
Starting with the G84/G86 GPUs (Tesla (microarchitecture)) (sold as the GeForce 8400/8500/8600 series), Nvidia substantially re-designed the H.264 decoding block inside its GPUs.  The second generation PureVideo HD added a dedicated bitstream processor (BSP) and enhanced video processor, which enabled the GPU to completely offload the H.264-decoding pipeline. VC-1 acceleration was also improved, with PureVideo HD now able to offload more of VC-1-decoding pipeline's backend (inverse discrete cosine transform (iDCT) and motion compensation stages).  The frontend (bitstream) pipeline is still decoded by the host CPU.
The second generation PureVideo HD enabled mainstream PCs to play HD DVD and Blu-ray movies, as the majority of the processing-intensive video-decoding was now offloaded to the GPU.

The second generation PureVideo HD is sometimes called "PureVideo HD 2" or VP2, although this is not an official Nvidia designation. It corresponds to Nvidia Feature Set A (or "VDPAU Feature Set A").

This is the earliest generation that Adobe Flash Player supports for hardware acceleration of H.264 video on Windows.

The third generation PureVideo HD
This implementation of PureVideo HD, VP3 added entropy hardware to offload VC-1 bitstream decoding with the G98 GPU (sold as GeForce 8400GS), as well as additional minor enhancements for the MPEG-2 decoding block.  The functionality of the H.264-decoding pipeline was left unchanged.  In essence, VP3 offers complete hardware-decoding for all 3 video codecs of the Blu-ray Disc format: MPEG-2, VC-1, and H.264.

All third generation PureVideo hardware (G98, MCP77, MCP78, MCP79MX, MCP7A) cannot decode H.264 for the following horizontal resolutions: 769–784, 849–864, 929–944, 1009–1024, 1793–1808, 1873–1888, 1953–1968 and 2033–2048 pixels.

The third generation PureVideo HD is sometimes called "PureVideo HD 3" or VP3, although this is not an official Nvidia designation. It corresponds to Nvidia Feature Set B (or "VDPAU Feature Set B").

The fourth generation PureVideo HD
This implementation of PureVideo HD, VP4 added hardware to offload MPEG-4 Advanced Simple Profile (the compression format implemented by original DivX and Xvid) bitstream decoding with the GT215, GT216 and GT218 GPUs (sold as GeForce GT 240, GeForce GT 220 and GeForce 210/G210, respectively).  The H.264-decoder no longer suffers the framesize restrictions of VP3, and adds hardware-acceleration for MVC, a H.264 extension used on 3D Blu-ray discs. MVC acceleration is OS dependent: it is fully supported in Microsoft Windows through the Microsoft DXVA and Nvidia CUDA APIs, but is not supported through Nvidia's VDPAU API.

The fourth generation PureVideo HD is sometimes called "PureVideo HD 4" or VP4, although this is not an official Nvidia designation. It corresponds to Nvidia Feature Set C (or "VDPAU Feature Set C").

The fifth generation PureVideo HD
The fifth generation of PureVideo HD, introduced with the GeForce GT 520 (Fermi (microarchitecture)) and also included in the Nvidia GeForce 600/700 (Kepler (microarchitecture)) series GPUs has significantly improved performance when decoding H.264.
It is also capable of decoding 2160p 4K Ultra-High Definition (UHD) resolution videos at 3840 × 2160 pixels (doubling the 1080p Full High Definition standard in both the vertical and horizontal dimensions) and, depending on the driver and the used codec, higher resolutions of up to 4032 × 4080 pixels.

The fifth generation PureVideo HD is sometimes called "PureVideo HD 5" or "VP5", although this is not an official Nvidia designation. This generation of PureVideo HD corresponds to Nvidia Feature Set D (or "VDPAU Feature Set D").

The sixth generation PureVideo HD
The sixth generation of PureVideo HD, introduced with the Maxwell (microarchitecture), e.g. in the GeForce GTX 750/GTX 750 Ti (GM107) and also included in the Nvidia GeForce 900 (Maxwell) series GPUs has significantly improved performance when decoding H.264 and MPEG-2.
It is also capable of decoding Digital Cinema Initiatives (DCI) 4K resolution videos at 4096 × 2160 pixels and, depending on the driver and the used codec, higher resolutions of up to 4096 × 4096 pixels.
GPUs with Feature Set E support an enhanced error concealment mode which provides more robust error handling when decoding corrupted video streams.

The sixth generation PureVideo HD is sometimes called "PureVideo HD 6" or "VP6", although this is not an official Nvidia designation.  This generation of PureVideo HD corresponds to Nvidia Feature Set E (or "VDPAU Feature Set E").

The seventh generation PureVideo HD
The seventh generation of PureVideo HD, introduced with the GeForce GTX 960 and GTX 950, a second generation Maxwell (microarchitecture) GPU (GM206), adds full hardware-decode of H.265 HEVC Version 1 (Main and Main 10 profiles) to the GPU's video-engine. Feature Set F hardware decoder also supports full fixed function VP9 (video codec) hardware decoding.

Previous Maxwell GPUs implemented HEVC playback using a hybrid decoding solution, which involved both the host-CPU and the GPU's GPGPU array.  The hybrid implementation is significantly slower than the dedicated hardware in VP7's video-engine.

The seventh generation PureVideo HD is sometimes called "PureVideo HD 7" or "VP7", although this is not an official Nvidia designation.  This generation of PureVideo HD corresponds to Nvidia Feature Set F (or "VDPAU Feature Set F").

The eighth generation PureVideo HD
The eighth generation of PureVideo HD, introduced with the GeForce GTX 1080, GTX 1070,  GTX 1060, GTX 1050 Ti & GTX 1050, GT 1030 & GT 1010, a Pascal (microarchitecture) GPU, adds full hardware-decode of HEVC Version 2 Main 12 profile, and increases the resolution for VP9 and HEVC decoding to 8K, including 8K UHDTV and up to 8K fulldome 8192x8192.

Previous Maxwell GM200/GM204 GPUs implemented HEVC playback using a hybrid decoding solution, which involved both the host-CPU and the GPU's GPGPU array. The hybrid implementation is significantly slower than the dedicated hardware in VP8's video-engine.

The eighth generation PureVideo HD is sometimes called "PureVideo HD 8" or "VP8", although this is not an official Nvidia designation.  This generation of PureVideo HD corresponds to Nvidia Feature Set H (or "VDPAU Feature Set H").

The ninth generation PureVideo HD
The ninth generation of PureVideo HD, introduced with the NVIDIA TITAN V, a Volta (microarchitecture) GPU.

The ninth generation PureVideo HD is sometimes called "PureVideo HD 9" or "VP9", although this is not an official Nvidia designation.  This generation of PureVideo HD corresponds to Nvidia Feature Set I (or "VDPAU Feature Set I").

The tenth generation PureVideo HD
The tenth generation of PureVideo HD, introduced with the NVIDIA GeForce RTX 2080 Ti, RTX 2080,  RTX 2070, RTX 2060, GTX 1660 Ti, GTX 1660 & GTX 1650, a Turing (microarchitecture) GPU, adds full hardware-decoding for three additional HEVC Version 2 profiles (Main 4:4:4, Main 4:4:4 10 and Main 4:4:4 12) to the GPU's video-engine.

The tenth generation PureVideo HD is sometimes called "PureVideo HD 10" or "VP10", although this is not an official Nvidia designation.  This generation of PureVideo HD corresponds to Nvidia Feature Set J (or "VDPAU Feature Set J").

The eleventh generation PureVideo HD
The eleventh generation of PureVideo HD, introduced with the NVIDIA GeForce RTX 3090, RTX 3080 Ti, RTX 3080, RTX 3070 Ti, RTX 3070, RTX 3060 Ti, RTX 3060, RTX 3050 Ti and RTX 3050, an Ampere (microarchitecture) GPU, with fifth generation NVDEC introduces 8K@60 hardware-decoding capability for AV1 Main profile (4:0:0 and 4:2:2 chroma subsampling with 8 or 10-bit depth) with resolution of up to 8192 x 8192 pixels to the GPU's video-engine.

The eleventh generation PureVideo HD is sometimes called "PureVideo HD 11" or "VP11", although this is not an official Nvidia designation. This generation of PureVideo HD corresponds to Nvidia Feature Set K (or "VDPAU Feature Set K").

Naming confusion
Because the introduction and subsequent rollout of PureVideo technology was not synchronized with Nvidia's GPU release schedule, the exact capabilities of PureVideo technology and their supported Nvidia GPUs led to a considerable customer confusion. The first generation PureVideo GPUs (GeForce 6 series) spanned a wide range of capabilities.  On the low-end of GeForce 6 series (6200), PureVideo was limited to standard-definition content (720×576). The mainstream and high-end of the GeForce 6 series was split between older products (6800 GT) which did not accelerate H.264/VC-1 at all, and newer products (6600 GT) with added VC-1/H.264 offloading capability.

In 2006, PureVideo HD was formally introduced with the launch of the GeForce 7900, which had the first generation PureVideo HD. In 2007, when the second generation PureVideo HD (VP2) hardware launched with the Geforce 8500 GT/8600 GT/8600 GTS, Nvidia expanded Purevideo HD to include both the first generation (retroactively called "PureVideo HD 1" or VP1) GPUs (Geforce 7900/8800 GTX) and newer VP2 GPUs.  This led to a confusing product portfolio containing GPUs from two distinctly different generational capabilities: the newer VP2 based cores (Geforce 8500 GT/8600 GT/8600 GTS/8800 GT) and other older PureVideo HD 1 based cores (Geforce 7900/G80).

Nvidia claims that all GPUs carrying the PureVideo HD label fully support Blu-ray/HD DVD playback with the proper system components.  For H.264/AVC content, VP1 offers markedly inferior acceleration compared to newer GPUs, placing a much greater burden on the host CPU.  However, a sufficiently fast host CPU can play Blu-ray without any hardware assistance whatsoever.

Table of GPUs containing a PureVideo SIP block

Nvidia VDPAU Feature Sets 
Nvidia VDPAU Feature Sets are different hardware generations of Nvidia GPU's supporting different levels of hardware decoding capabilities. For feature sets A, B and C, the maximum video width and height are 2048 pixels, minimum width and height 48 pixels, and all codecs are currently limited to a maximum of 8192 macroblocks (8190 for VC-1/WMV9).
Partial acceleration means that VLD (bitstream) decoding is performed on the CPU, with the GPU only performing IDCT, motion compensation and deblocking. Complete acceleration means that the GPU performs all of VLD, IDCT, motion compensation and deblocking.

Feature Set A 
 Supports complete acceleration for H.264 and partial acceleration for MPEG-1, MPEG-2, VC-1/WMV9

Feature Set B 
 Supports complete acceleration for MPEG-1, MPEG-2, VC-1/WMV9 and H.264.
 Note that all Feature Set B hardware cannot decode H.264 for the following widths: 769-784, 849-864, 929-944, 1009-1024, 1793-1808, 1873-1888, 1953-1968, 2033-2048 pixels.

Feature Set C 
 Supports complete acceleration for MPEG-1, MPEG-2, MPEG-4 Part 2 (a.k.a. MPEG-4 ASP), VC-1/WMV9 and H.264.
 Global motion compensation and Data Partitioning are not supported for MPEG-4 Part 2.

Feature Set D 
Similar to feature set C but added support for decoding H.264 with a resolution of up to 4032 × 4080 and MPEG-1/MPEG-2 with a resolution of up to 4032 × 4048 pixels.

Feature Set E 
Similar to feature set D but added support for decoding H.264 with a resolution of up to 4096 × 4096 and MPEG-1/MPEG-2 with a resolution of up to 4080 × 4080 pixels. GPUs with VDPAU feature set E support an enhanced error concealment mode which provides more robust error handling when decoding corrupted video streams. Cards with this feature set use a combination of the PureVideo hardware and software running on the shader array to decode HEVC (H.265) as partial/hybrid hardware video decoding.

Feature Set F 
Supports complete acceleration of HEVC Main (8-bit) & Main 10 (10-bit) and VP9 profile 0 (8-bit) with a resolution of up to 4096 × 2304 pixels.

Feature Set G 
Supports complete acceleration of HEVC Main 12 (12-bit) with a resolution of up to 4096 × 4096 pixels.

Feature Set H 
Supports complete acceleration of VP9 profile 2 (10-bit) and maximum resolution of up to 8192 x 8192 pixels (8k resolution) for all HEVC and VP9 profiles.

Feature Set I 

As feature set H with increased efficiency.

Feature Set J 

Supports complete acceleration of three additional HEVC Version 2 profiles (Main 4:4:4, Main 4:4:4 10 and Main 4:4:4 12).

Feature Set K 
As feature set J with increased efficiency. Initially, hardware AV1 decoding support was introduced only to the Nvidia's proprietary NVDEC API for the eleventh generation PureVideo HD GPUs. AV1 decoding was added to the open source VDPAU API feature set K more than a year later in January 2022.

See also 
 DirectX Video Acceleration (DXVA) API for Microsoft Windows operating-system.
 VDPAU (Video Decode and Presentation API for Unix) from Nvidia – current Nvidia optimized media API for Linux/UNIX operating-systems
 Video Acceleration API (VA API) – an alternative video acceleration API for Linux/UNIX operating-system.
 OpenMAX IL (Open Media Acceleration Integration Layer) – a royalty-free cross-platform media abstraction API from the Khronos Group
 X-Video Motion Compensation (XvMC) API – first media API for Linux/UNIX operating-systems, now practically obsolete.

Hardware video hardware technologies

Nvidia 

GeForce 256's Motion Compensation
High-Definition Video Processor
Video Processing Engine
Nvidia NVENC
Nvidia NVDEC

 List of Nvidia graphics processing units

AMD 

 Video Core Next - AMD

 Unified Video Decoder - AMD
 Video Shader - ATI

Intel 

 Quick Sync Video - Intel
 Clear Video - Intel
Qualcomm

 Qualcomm Hexagon

References

External links 
Nvidia's PureVideo HD homepage

Nvidia IP cores
Video acceleration
Video compression and decompression ASIC